Alaa El Idrissi Is a Judoka Originally From Morocco, Born 31 October 1987 in Casablanca. 
The 2010 African Judo Championships were the 30th edition of the African Judo Championships, and were held in Mauritius from 30 April to 3 May 2009.

Medal overview

Men

Women

Medals table

References

External links
 

A
African Judo Championships
African Judo Championships
International sports competitions hosted by Mauritius
African Judo Championships, 2009
Judo competitions in Mauritius
April 2009 sports events in Africa
May 2009 sports events in Africa